Jah Shaka, also known as the Zulu Warrior is a Jamaican reggae/dub sound system operator who has been operating a South East London-based, roots reggae Jamaican sound system since the early 1970s. His name is an amalgamation of the Rastafarian term for God and that of the Zulu king Shaka Zulu.

Career
Jah Shaka was born in Clarendon Parish, Jamaica, an area which has produced numerous roots reggae stars, amongst them Toots Hibbert, Everton Blender, Barrington Levy and Freddie McGregor.

Jah Shaka started out on the Freddie Cloudburst Sound System as an operator, before setting up his own sound system. By the late 1970s Shaka's system had rapidly gained a large and loyal following due to the combination of spiritual content, high energy rhythms, massive sonority, and his dynamic personal style. That following notably included many of the pioneers of post-punk such as Public Image Ltd and The Slits. 
In 1980 Shaka played himself in the film Babylon (directed by Franco Rosso, although he directed the scene he appeared in), operating his Sound System in a soundclash at the climax of the story.

Shaka stayed true to his spiritual and distinct musical style during the 1980s when many other Sound Systems had started to follow the Jamaican trend towards playing less orthodox styles tending towards slack dancehall music.

In 1989, Shaka visited Jamaica and worked with many musicians there, including King Tubby.

On 23 September 2000, he suffered numerous injuries during a house fire.

In 2002, Jah Shaka appeared before a large crowd in New York City's Central Park.

Live footage of Shaka is featured in the documentary All Tomorrow's Parties based on the musical festival, which was released in 2009.

The Jah Shaka Sound System continues to appear regularly in London, with occasional tours of the United States, Europe and Japan.

Label
On his own record label he has released music from Jamaican artists such as Max Romeo, Johnny Clarke, Bim Sherman and Prince Alla as well as UK groups such as Aswad and Dread & Fred. He has released a number of dub albums, often under the Commandments of Dub banner.

Artists featured on more recent releases include both established singers like Tony Tuff, and new emerging artists like Rockaway and Principle - who have sung over riddims produced by his son Malachi, known as Young Warrior.

Style and influence
Shaka's uncompromising "Warrior Style" has inspired a host of new UK reggae artists and Sound Systems such as Eastern Sher, The Disciples, Iration Steppas, Jah Warrior, Channel One Sound System, Conscious Sounds, 
Aba Shanti-I and Zion Train. Non-reggae artists such as Basement Jaxx have cited Jah Shaka as being their best night out ever.

Jah Shaka events are renowned for attracting a wide audience from all backgrounds, races and ages. His dances attract numbers previously thought unthinkable for this genre of music. Shaka believes it to be a testament to the quality of the message that he expounds in his choice of music and his Rastafarian beliefs. His followers are known to be vocally ardent, and have developed dance steps that resemble African war dances.

Jah Shaka's music has had a profound influence on genres in the UK like Junglist, a ghetto style born out of the UK soundsystem culture. Jah Shaka's son Young Warrior has now started his own sound system, to great acclaim. Drum and bass is also deeply influenced by Jah Shaka's sound system frequencies, and a number of the DJ's who feature in that genre, such as Congo Natty frequently name check Shaka's sound. Don Letts has also frequently referenced the influence of Jah Shaka on John Lydon and on the punk scene as a whole.

Non-musical work
Shaka has also established the Jah Shaka Foundation to carry out assistance with projects in Ghana, where the foundation has bought  of land in Agri, 30 miles outside of Accra. It has also managed to distribute medical supplies, wheelchairs, library books, carpentry tools, drawing materials and records to clinics, schools and radio stations in the Accra area establishing important links with the local communities. Shaka himself was actually a youth worker years ago, and has regularly been quoted encouraging youths to study geography and history so they know "what's happened, where it's happening and who's doing it".

References

External links
Official website
Jah Shaka interview  by Ray Hurford for Boomshakalacka zine, 1990.
Jah Shaka interview
Jah Shaka interview by Ray Hurford and Colin Moore
In depth interviews about Jah Shaka's influence on punk rock, drum and bass, junglist and Britain's sound system culture
Jah Shaka interview by Pier Tosi
The Jah Shaka Dub Commandments - Illustrated Discography
PunkCast#171 Live video of Jah Shaka performing in NYC's Central Park on 23 June 2002. (RealPlayer)
Jah Shaka to play at BASS 2010 - Jah Shaka playing this June as part of Bass Festival

Dub musicians
British reggae musicians
Sound systems
Living people
Year of birth missing (living people)
People from Clarendon Parish, Jamaica